The 1988 Baltimore Orioles had the worst start to a season in modern American baseball history. The Orioles finished 7th in the American League East, reduced to a record of 54 wins and 107 losses just five seasons after winning the World Series. The season is most notable for the 0–21 start that lasted from April 4th to April 28th. Manager Cal Ripken, Sr. was fired after an 0–6 start and replaced by Hall of Famer Frank Robinson. The Orioles won their first game of the year against the Chicago White Sox at Comiskey Park on April 29. The most runs allowed during the season was 15 in a game on June 19 while the most runs scored was 12 in a game on May 31. Orioles owner Edward Bennett Williams died in August of that year.

This was only the second time that the Orioles had lost at least 100 games (the other being their inaugural season of 1954); in addition, the 107 losses would not be surpassed until 30 years later. It was the team's fifth-worst overall franchise record, behind only 1939 (43–111), 2018 (47–115), 2021 (52-110) and 2019 (54–108).

Offseason
 October 8, 1987: Mike Kinnunen was released by the Orioles.
 October 8, 1987: Mike Hart was released by the Orioles.
 November 6, 1987: Rico Rossy and Terry Crowley Jr. (minors) were traded by the Orioles to the Pittsburgh Pirates for Joe Orsulak.
 February 27, 1988: Ray Knight was traded by the Orioles to the Detroit Tigers for Mark Thurmond.
 March 21, 1988: Mike Young and a player to be named later were traded by the Orioles to the Philadelphia Phillies for Rick Schu, Keith Hughes and Jeff Stone. The Orioles completed the deal by sending Frank Bellino (minors) to the Phillies on June 14.

Regular season
 April 4, 1988: The Milwaukee Brewers defeated the Orioles 12–0, setting a record for the largest margin of victory in a shutout win on Opening Day.
 September 7, 1988: Curt Schilling made his major league debut. He pitched against the Boston Red Sox and pitched in 7 innings. Schilling gave up 6 hits and 3 earned runs. He had 2 strikeouts and 5 bases on balls.

The losing streak
 Game 13: The Orioles tied the 1904 Washington Senators and the 1920 Detroit Tigers for most losses to start the season with 13 losses when they lost to the Brewers 9–5 in Milwaukee.
 Game 14: On a cold, wet night, 7,284 witnessed baseball history at Milwaukee's County Stadium. Baltimore became the first team in MLB history to start the season 0–14 as the Brewers won, 8–6. No MLB team would lose this many games in a row to open a season until the 1997 Chicago Cubs did so.
 Game 21: The Orioles lost 4–2 to the Minnesota Twins in Minnesota, extending their streak of season-starting losses to half again their original record, marking their seventh straight series being swept, and ending the day 16 games out of first place on April 28.

Season standings

Record vs. opponents

Opening Day starters
Mike Boddicker
Terry Kennedy
Fred Lynn
Eddie Murray
Joe Orsulak
Billy Ripken
Cal Ripken Jr.
Rick Schu
Larry Sheets
Jeff Stone

Notable transactions
 April 2, 1988: Dickie Noles was signed as a free agent with the Orioles.
 April 5, 1988: Mickey Tettleton was signed as a free agent by the Orioles.
 June 1, 1988: Pete Rose Jr. was drafted by the Orioles in the 12th round of the 1988 Major League Baseball Draft. Player signed September 1, 1988.
 July 29, 1988: Mike Boddicker was traded by the Orioles to the Boston Red Sox for Brady Anderson and Curt Schilling.

Roster

Player stats

Batting

Starters by position
Note: Pos = Position; G = Games played; AB = At bats; H = Hits; HR = Home runs; RBI = Runs batted in; Avg. = Batting average

Other batters
Note: G = Games played; AB = At bats; H = Hits; HR = Home runs; RBI = Runs batted in; Avg. = Batting average

Pitching

Starting pitchers
Note: G = Games pitched; IP = Innings pitched; W = Wins; L = Losses; ERA = Earned run average; SO = Strikeouts

Other pitchers
Note: G = Games pitched; IP = Innings pitched; W = Wins; L = Losses; ERA = Earned run average; SO = Strikeouts

Relief pitchers
Note: G = Games pitched; IP = Innings pitched; W = Wins; L = Losses; SV = Saves; ERA = Earned run average; SO = Strikeouts

Farm system

LEAGUE CHAMPIONS: Rochester

References

1988 Baltimore Orioles team page at Baseball Reference
1988 Baltimore Orioles season at baseball-almanac.com

Baltimore Orioles seasons
Baltimore Orioles season
Baltimore Orioles